Avsuyu is a town in the central district (Antakya) of Hatay Province, Turkey. It is  about north east of Antakya. The population of Avsuyu was 4860  as of 2012. Main crops of the town are olive, pepper, tobacco and cotton. There is an oil press in the town.

References

Populated places in Hatay Province
Towns in Turkey
Antakya District